Guangdong-Hong Kong Cup 1999–00 is the 22nd staging of this two-leg competition between Hong Kong and Guangdong.

The first leg was played in Guangzhou while the second leg was played in Hong Kong Stadium, both in 2000.

Hong Kong regained the champion after losing it for 6 consecutive years by winning an aggregate 2–1.

Squads

Hong Kong
Some of the players in the squad include:
  Mike Leonard 李安納
  Lo Kai Wah 羅繼華
  Gerard Ambassa Guy 卓卓
  Cristiano Preigchadt Cordeiro 高尼路
  Lee Kin Wo 李健和
  Gerardo Laterza 謝利
  Dejan Antonić 迪恩
  Cheng Siu Chung Ricky 鄭兆聰
  Alen Bajkusa 巴古沙
  Leandro Simioni 李安度
  Ailton Grigorio de Araujo 亞拉烏蘇
  Gary McKeown 麥基昂
  Dimitre Kalkanov 卡根洛夫
  Zeljko Gavrilovic 加連奴域

Guangdong

Results
First Leg

Second Leg

References
 HKFA website 省港盃回憶錄(九) (in chinese)

2000
2000 in Chinese football
1999–2000 in Hong Kong football